Empire Bardolph was a  refrigerated cargo ship which was built in 1942 for the Ministry of War Transport (MoWT). It was sold in 1946 and renamed Memling and sold again in 1953 and renamed Vancouver Star, being renamed Memling in 1957. It was scrapped in 1959.

History
Empire Bardolph was built by Short Brothers Ltd, Sunderland as yard number 474. She was launched on 8 December 1942 and completed in March 1943. Empire Bardolph was built for the MoWT and initially operated under the management of Donaldson Brothers & Black Ltd. Management passed to Lamport and Holt Line Ltd in 1944 Empire Bardolph had  of refrigerated cargo space in her holds.

War service
Empire Bardolph was a member of a number of convoys during the Second World War.

SL 165

Convoy SL 162 departed Freetown, Sierra Leone on 20 July 1944 and arrived at Liverpool on 10 August.
Empire Bardolph was carrying meat and general cargo.

OS 87

Convoy OS 87 departed Liverpool on 25 August 1944 and arrived at Freetown on 13 September. Empire Bardolph was bound for the River Plate.

Postwar
In 1946, Empire Bardolph was sold to Lamport and Holt Line Ltd and renamed Memling. She was one of the first two ships acquired by Lamport & Holt after the war. She was sold in 1953 to Blue Star Line and renamed Vancouver Star, being renamed Memling in 1957. On 23 October 1959, Memling arrived at Vlissingen, Netherlands for scrapping.

Propulsion
She was propelled by a triple expansion steam engine which was built by North East Marine Engineering Company (1938) Ltd, Newcastle upon Tyne.

Official number and call sign
Official numbers were a forerunner to IMO Numbers. Empire Bardolph had the UK official number 169109 and the Call sign BPKF.

References

1942 ships
Empire ships
Merchant ships of the United Kingdom
Ministry of War Transport ships
Ships of the Blue Star Line
Steamships of the United Kingdom
Ships built on the River Wear
World War II merchant ships of the United Kingdom
Ships of the Lamport and Holt Line